Protests erupted on 15 July to protest the water shortages and crisis, but quickly were met with police violence and brutality. "Bloody Aban", November 2021 saw further protests due to water shortages but various other protests and strikes also took place due to the worsening economic situation. 

In August 2021, Amnesty International noted that brutal forces have been used by the Security Forces to oppress the protesters.

Protests

July 2021

Protests broke out on 15 July in Khuzestan due to worsening water shortages during the summer and spread across the country in the following days.

September 2021
From 6–7 September, massive rallies protested the bad economic situation in Iran.

November 2021
By November the number of female demonstrators had heavily increased.

From November 9–27 crowds of 2,000-3,000 Iranians in Isfahan gathered to hold demonstrations against water shortages, which increasingly grew violent over time. On November 27, the Islamic Republic employed large numbers of riot police, arrested at least 67 protesters, and repressed the protests.

February 2022 
On February 1, 2022, thousands of teachers across the country performed a one-day strike after three consecutive days of protests. The next day, a policeman was stabbed to death by an unknown attacker. Military officer Hossein Ashtari proposed a new law that would make it easier for police officers to use firearms, prompting worries that such a practice could provide a license to police brutality against civilians.

2022 food protests 

Protests in Iran broke out in early May after a hike in wheat prices.

See also
 Mahsa Amini protests 
 2011 Khuzestan protests
 2018 Khuzestan protests
 2018 Iranian water protests
 2019–2020 Iranian protests

References

 
Protests
Protests
2021 protests
2022 protests
2021
Presidency of Ebrahim Raisi